The Colônia crater is a recently confirmed impact crater located in the municipality of São Paulo, Brazil. The name comes from the town district of Colônia located just north of the feature.

Geology and ecology 
It was formed between 1 million and 20 million years ago, in crystalline basement rocks 600 to 700 millions of years old. The Earth Impact Database gives a range of 36 to 5 Ma. In any case, it would be one of the youngest South American impact craters known. The upper , in particular, have provided a detailed climate and ecological record of the last 130,000 years; the complete record may stretch back to 2.5 million years ago.

Sediment analysis indicate that until 18,000 years ago a lake occupied the central part of the crater, which has become a swamp. The crater is drained towards the east by the Vargem Grande creek into the adjacent Billings Reservoir.

The tentative identification as an impact crater is based mainly on geomorphology, faulting pattern, and on the exclusion of other possible formation mechanisms. In particular, there are no carbonate rocks that could produce to karstic sinkholes. As of 2011 there were no reports of definite evidence, such as shatter cones or shocked quartz. To find such evidence one would have to drill through the sediment fill.

Urbanization and legal status 
Besides the central swamp, the crater encloses remains of the native Atlantic rainforest. Starting in 1989, the northern part of the crater has been gradually occupied by irregular housing that comprise the Vargem Grande neighborhood, now home to 35,000 to 40,000 people. To prevent further degradation, the crater has been declared a protected natural landmark, registered in 1995 by the CONDEPHAAT. Its southern part was incorporated to the Capivari Monos Municipal Parkland in 1996.

See also 

 List of impact craters on Earth

References

Further reading 
 C. Riccomini, F.A.P.S. Neves, B. Turcq (1992), Astroblema de Colônia (São Paulo, Brasil): Estágio atual de conhecimento. 37º Congresso Brasileiro de Geologia, Sociedade Brasileira de Geologia.

Impact craters of Brazil
Geography of São Paulo
Landforms of São Paulo (state)
Geology of Brazil